MZI may refer to:

 Mach–Zehnder interferometer
 Mazda MZI, a version of the Ford Mondeo V6 automobile engine
 MZI, IATA code for Mopti Airport, Mali
 mzi, ISO 639-3 language code for Ixcatlán Mazatec, one of the Mazatecan languages